CORTIME is an optimization tool for 3D CAD published by Apiosoft company. Cortime automates the design exploration, optimization and testing. A user with SolidWorks licence can work on Cortime.

Timeline
CORTIME was founded based on an idea originated from a Ph.D. project from Thøger Kari Jensen at Aalborg University in 2013. In 2016, Rasmus Høtoft Sørensen joined Apiosoft as CEO.

Release history 
In February 2017, CORTIME beta version was released at Los Angeles, USA. CORTIME will initially be sold through SolidWorks and reseller worldwide on a SaaS model.

About
CORTIME integrates with SolidWorks CAD program with the optimization algorithms that enables users to optimize their designs automatically. Users can download CORTIME software from Apiosoft's website. Engineers can include several variables in their calculations while making it faster. It will help engineers in developing turbines blades, ship rotors, light sources, refrigeration systems and many more.

Model set up
CORTIME can set up optimization models in 3 steps.
 Define objectives
 Assign variables
 Configure the optimization algorithm

References 

Computer system optimization software